Kaure is a Papuan language of West Papua. It is spoken in the villages of Lereh, Harna, Wes, Masta, and Aurina.

Narau is either a dialect or a closely related language. It is known from a short word list in Giël (1959). Texts include Auri et al. (1991).

Phonology

Consonants
The Kaure consonants are:

Vowels
The Kaure vowels are:

Tone
Like the Lakes Plain languages, Kaure is a tonal language. There are two tones, namely high and low.

Monosyllabic minimal pairs showing phonemic tone contrast include:
tái ‘footprint’, tài ‘sago’
pí ‘boil’, pì ‘pig’
hín ‘limbum wood’, hìn ‘blood’
héik ‘flower’, hèik ‘snake’

In multisyllabic words, only one stressed syllable carries full tone contrasts, while the other syllables are "neutral" or toneless.

Multisyllabic minimal sets include:
káteil ‘toss it’, katéil ‘dry’, katèil ‘dry’
nálain ‘female animal’, naláin ‘kind of root’, nalàin ‘to run off’

Pronouns
Attested pronouns are 1sg wẽ, 2sg hane, 1pl nene. The 2sg form resembles Mek *ka-n, and 1pl resembles Pauwasi numu~nin, but apart from that little can be said.

Kaure pronouns listed by Foley (2018) are:

{| 
!  !! Independent !! Possessive prefixes
|-
! 1excl
| wen || na-
|-
! 1incl
| nene || nene-
|-
! 2
| hane || ha-
|-
! 3
| nene || ne-
|}

Kaure pronouns are not specified for number, just like in Nimboran.

Kaure–Kapori hypothesis
Voorhoeve (1975) suggested that Kaure was related to Kapori and Kosare, two otherwise unclassified languages.  However, subsequent evaluations have not found any significant connections (Rumaropen 2006, Wambaliau 2006).

References

Further reading

Benny Rumaropen (2006). Draft Survey Report on the Kapauri Language of Papua. SIL Electronic Survey Reports.
Theresia Wambaliau (2006). Draft Laporan Survei pada Bahasa Kosare di Papua, Indonesia. SIL Electronic Survey Reports.
Dommel, Peter R., Gudrun E. Dommel, Pieter Auri and Markus Pokoko. 1991. Kaure Vocabulary. Jayapura: Cooperative Program of the University of Cenderawasih and the Summer Institute of Linguistics.
Dommel, Peter R. and Gudrun Dommel. 1993. Orang Kaure. In: Etnografi Irian Jaya: panduan sosial budaya (buku satu). 21–75. [Jayapura]: Kelompok Peneliti Etnografi Irian Jaya.
Giël, R. 1959. Exploratie Oost-Meervlakte [Exploration of the Eastern Lakes Plain Area]. Nationaal Archief, Den Haag, Ministerie van Koloniën: Kantoor Bevolkingszaken Nieuw-Guinea te Hollandia: Rapportenarchief, 1950–1962, nummer toegang 2.10.25, inventarisnummer 13. (Contains word lists of Taworta, Taria, Airo, Kaowera, Manowa (Boromesso), and Narau)

Kaure–Kosare languages
Languages of western New Guinea
Language isolates of New Guinea
Tonal languages